Jean-Jacques-François Le Barbier (born in Rouen on 11 November 1738 – died in Paris on 7 May 1826) was a writer, illustrator and painter of French history. 
By 1780 he was an official painter of the King of France.

He was the father of artist Élise Bruyère.

Work
His most famous work was a representation of the Declaration of the Rights of Man and of the Citizen made in 1789.  He also designed the suite of tapestries of the four contingents (1790–91).

Select list of work
 Courage des femmes de Sparte se défendant contre les Messéniens, Musée du Louvre, Paris;
 Étude de femme en fureur, Musée Magnin de Dijon;
 Henri IV et Sully à Fontainebleau, Musée des beaux-arts de Pau;
 Jupiter endormi sur le mont Ida, École nationale supérieure des beaux-arts de Paris;
 La Grotte d’Égérie, Musée des beaux-arts de Rouen;
 Le Vieux Mari, Musée Cantini de Marseille;
 Les Amants surpris, Musée Cantini de Marseille;
 Martyre de saint Sébastien, Musée des beaux-arts de Rouen;
 Scène d’Amérique du Nord, Musée des beaux-arts de Rouen;
 Un Canadien et sa femme pleurant sur le tombeau de leur enfant, Musée des beaux-arts de Rouen, tableau interprété en gravure par François Robert Ingouf;
 Le Courage héroïque du jeune Désilles, le 31 août 1790, à l'Affaire de Nancy, Vizille, musée de la Révolution française;
 L'Apothéose de Rameau, Musée d'art et d'histoire de Toul;
 Portrait de Madame Roland, Musée d'art de Toulon;
 L'Apothéose de Lulli, Musée d'Art et d'histoire de Toul;
 La Déclaration des droits de l'homme et du citoyen de 1789, Musée Carnavalet, Paris.

References

External links

Writers from Rouen
18th-century French painters
French male painters
19th-century French painters
French history painters
19th-century French writers
1738 births
1826 deaths
French male writers
19th-century French male writers
19th-century French male artists
Artists from Rouen
18th-century French male artists